Radar Online is an American entertainment and gossip website that was first published as a print and online publication in September 2003 before becoming exclusively online. As of 2008, the magazine has been owned by the publisher American Media Inc. American Media's former Chief Content Officer, Dylan Howard, oversaw the publication until 2020.

History
The magazine Radar published articles on entertainment, fashion, politics, and human interest and was founded and edited by Maer Roshan in September 2003. After a series of three test issues focused on satire, he relaunched it in 2005 and again in 2006 with help from investors and family members, including Jeffrey Epstein. Radar was awarded a General Excellence nomination by the American Society of Magazine Editors in 2007. Its website, Radar Online, earned an audience of one million a month soon after it launched.

The print magazine was suddenly shuttered in 2008 after its primary backer, billionaire Ron Burkle, who owned a substantial interest in Star and National Enquirer publisher American Media, withdrew. Radar Online was relaunched in March 2009 with a rebranding, focusing on celebrity items about gossip, fashion, and pop culture. All articles previously published by Radar Online were erased from the site.

References

External links
 Official site
 Ongoing Radar coverage on Gawker.com

2003 establishments in the United States
Satirical magazines published in the United States
Defunct magazines published in the United States
Magazines established in 2003
Magazines disestablished in 2008
Internet properties established in 2009
Online magazines with defunct print editions
Online magazines published in the United States